The Folóï oak forest is an oak forest in southwestern Greece. It is located in the municipal unit Foloi, Elis, in the western part of the Peloponnese peninsula. The Folóï oak forest is situated at an altitude of 688m, on the plateau of the Folóï mountain.

Mythology
The Pholóē oak forest was known to Ancient Greeks, because of its proximity to many of their settlements in the Elis region.  The mysterious beauty of the forest inspired them to believe that it was a habitat of centaurs and dryads. They gave the forest the name Pholóē (modern Greek pronunciation: Folóï) and the chief of the Centaurs the name Phólos. The dryads were "oak spirits" of the forest.

Flora
The broadleaf oak, Quercus frainetto (Hungarian oak) is the primary species of oak in the forest, and it covers the biggest part of its territory. The trees are 15–20 m tall and can live up to 200 years. Quercus pubescens (downy oak) and evergreen Quercus ilex (holm oak) are also present, though their population is substantially smaller. Besides oaks, ferns and asphodels are very common and they tend to grow in the space between the trunks of the trees.

Fauna
The acorns provide an abundant source of food for animals such as hares, squirrels, hedgehogs, which are found in significant populations. The ecosystem of the forest is a food chain which also contains badgers, pine martens, foxes, eagles, turtles, weasels, owls, skylarks, jackals, magpies, vipers, rat snakes and others.

Protection status
The Folóï oak forest has been designated the status of a protected area enlisted in the Natura 2000 ecological network of the E.U.

Nearest places
Ancient Olympia

Gallery

References

External links

Forests of Greece
Mediterranean forests, woodlands, and scrub
Environment of the Mediterranean
Natura 2000 in Greece
 
Quercus
Elis
Geography of Western Greece